The 1997–98 IHL season was the 53rd season of the International Hockey League, a North American minor professional league. 18 teams participated in the regular season, and the Chicago Wolves won the Turner Cup. Gordie Howe came out of retirement to play one shift for the Detroit Vipers in the middle of this season.

Regular season

Eastern Conference

Western Conference

Turner Cup-Playoffs

External links
 Season 1997/98 on hockeydb.com

IHL
IHL
International Hockey League (1945–2001) seasons